Huadiwan is a metro station on Line 1 of the Guangzhou Metro that started operations on 28June 1997. It is situated under Huadi Avenue North in the Liwan District of Guangzhou City, Guangdong Province, China. It is near the Huadi Bird Fish & Insect Market.

The station is unique in being the only station on the Guangzhou Metro to use 'cut and cover' construction. The station is located in a large single-vault tunnel with two side platforms and two mezzanine-style concourses one at each end of the platform. Half-height platform-edge-doors are used.

Station layout

Exits

References

Railway stations in China opened in 1997
Guangzhou Metro stations in Liwan District